The 2018–19 Maryland Terrapins women's basketball team represented the University of Maryland, College Park in 2018–19 NCAA Division I women's basketball season. The Terrapins, led by seventeenth year head coach Brenda Frese, played their home games at the Xfinity Center as members of the Big Ten Conference. They finished the season 29–4, 15–3 in Big Ten play to win the Big Ten regular season championship. They advanced to the championship of the Big Ten women's tournament where they lost to Iowa State. They received an at-large to the NCAA women's basketball tournament as the No. 4 seed in the Albany region. There they defeated Radford before losing to UCLA in the Second Round.

Roster

Recruits

Awards and honors

Preseason
 Kaila Charles
 Coached Preseason All-Big Ten team
 Media Preseason All-Big Ten team

Individual Awards
Brenda Frese
All-Big Ten Coach of the Year (coaches/media)

 Taylor Mikesell
Unanimous All-Big Ten Freshman of the Year
First Team All-Big Ten (media)
Second Team All-Big Ten (coaches)
Big Ten All-Freshman Team

 Kaila Charles
Unanimous First Team All-Big Ten (coaches/media)
Honorable Mention All-American (AP)

Stephanie Jones
Second Team All-Big Ten (Big Ten Media)
Honorable Mention All-Big Ten

Shakira Austin
Big Ten All-Freshman Team 
Big Ten All-Defensive Team
Honorable Mention All-Big Ten (Big Ten Media)

Sarah Myers
Big Ten Sportsmanship Award Honoree

Schedule and results

|-
!colspan=9 style=| Exhibition

|-
!colspan=9 style=| Non-conference regular season

|-
!colspan=9 style=| Big Ten regular season

|-
!colspan=9 style=| Big Ten Women's Tournament

|-
!colspan=9 style=| NCAA Women's Tournament

Source

Rankings
2018–19 NCAA Division I women's basketball rankings

^Coaches did not release a Week 2 poll.

See also
2018–19 Maryland Terrapins men's basketball team

References

External links
 Official Team Website

Maryland Terrapins women's basketball seasons
Maryland
Maryland
Maryland
Maryland